Syhlovate — village (selo) in Sambir Raion, Lviv Oblast, of Western Ukraine, deep in the Carpathians. It belongs to Borynia settlement hromada, one of the hromadas of Ukraine. 

Local government — Bitlianska village council. Residents of the village are engaged in agriculture and forestry.

In the village there is a church the Transfiguration of our Lord Jesus Christ. Also, the village has a school, forestry, bakery, workshop for furniture.

History 
The first mention of Syhlovate in historical documents refers to 1580.

Until 18 July 2020, Syhlovate belonged to Turka Raion. The raion was abolished in July 2020 as part of the administrative reform of Ukraine, which reduced the number of raions of Lviv Oblast to seven. The area of Turka Raion was merged into Sambir Raion.

References

External links 
 Турківщина 
  Історія Бойківщини 
 Дерев'яні церкви Турківського району. Сигловате  
 weather.in.ua

Villages in Sambir Raion